The Communauté de communes des Marches de Lorraine is a French former administrative association of rural communes in the Vosges département of eastern France and on the south-western edge of the region of Lorraine. It was merged into the new Communauté de communes des Vosges côté Sud-Ouest in January 2017.

Created in December 2003, the association had its administrative offices at Lamarche.

Composition
The Communauté de communes comprised the following communes:

 Ainvelle 
 Blevaincourt 
 Damblain 
 Fouchécourt 
 Frain 
 Isches 
 Lamarche 
 Marey 
 Martigny-les-Bains 
 Mont-lès-Lamarche 
 Morizécourt 
 Robécourt 
 Rocourt 
 Romain-aux-Bois 
 Rozières-sur-Mouzon
 Senaide
 Serécourt 
 Serocourt 
 Tollaincourt 
 Villotte

Responsibilities
The Association of Lamarche communes has the following responsibilities:
   Management of public spaces
   Economic Development
   Environmental protection and improvement
   Management of public spaces
   Housing
   Quality of life
   Construction, development and operation of cultural and sporting facilities together with primary school and kindergartens
   Technical support for highway maintenance

References

Marches de Lorraine